Dielis pilipes, the hairy-footed scoliid wasp, is a species of scoliid wasp in the family Scoliidae.

References

External links

 

Scoliidae
Insects described in 1858